Emad Munir El-Omar (born 23 July 1962) is a British physician and gastroenterologist who chairs the department of medicine at the University of New South Wales and is the editor in chief of The BMJ's Gut academic journal.

Education 
El-Omar studied medicine at the University of Glasgow where he trained as a gastroenterologist.

Career 
El-Omar is the chair of the medicine department at the University of New South Wales's St George & Sutherland Clinical School and the director of the university's microbiome research centre, which he helped create. He is the editor in chief of Gut academic journal.

He has been a visiting scholar and a visiting scientist at Vanderbilt University, and the National Cancer Institute, and was previously employed as a professor of gastroenterology at the University of Aberdeen from 2000 to 2016.

Personal life 
El-Omar is British, and lives in Australia.

References 

Living people
1962 births
British gastroenterologists
Academic journal editors
British emigrants to Australia